Clarence Douglas Dillon (born Clarence Douglass Dillon; August 21, 1909January 10, 2003) was an American diplomat and politician, who served as U.S. Ambassador to France (1953–1957) and as the 57th Secretary of the Treasury (1961–1965). He was also a member of the Executive Committee of the National Security Council (ExComm) during the Cuban Missile Crisis.

Early life
Dillon was born on August 21, 1909, in Geneva, Switzerland, the son of American parents, Anne McEldin (née Douglass) and financier Clarence Dillon. Although Dillon grew up as a patrician, his paternal grandfather, Samuel Lapowski, was a poor Jewish emigrant from Poland.  After leaving Poland, his grandfather settled in Texas after the American Civil War and married Dillon's Swedish-American grandmother. Dillon's father later changed his family name to Dillon, an Anglicization of "Dylion", his grandmother's maiden name. Dillon's mother was descended from the Graham family, Lairds of Tamrawer Castle at Kilsyth, Stirling, Scotland.

Dillon began his education at Pine Lodge School in Lakehurst, New Jersey, which he attended at the same time as three of the Rockefeller brothers, Nelson, Laurance, and John.  He continued at Groton School in Massachusetts, then at Harvard University, A.B. magna cum laude 1931 in American history and literature. Dillon earned a varsity letter for football his senior year.

Career
In 1938, he became Vice-President and Director of Dillon, Read & Co., a firm that bore his father's name (Clarence Dillon).  After his World War II service on Guam, on Saipan, and in the Philippines, he left the United States Navy as Lieutenant Commander decorated with the Legion of Merit and Air Medal.  In 1946 he became chairman of Dillon, Read; by 1952 he had doubled the firm's investments.

Political career
Dillon had been active in Republican politics since 1934.  He worked for John Foster Dulles in Thomas E. Dewey's 1948 presidential campaign.  In 1951 he organized the New Jersey effort to secure the 1952 Republican nomination for Dwight D. Eisenhower.  He was also a major contributor to Eisenhower's general election campaign in 1952.

President Eisenhower appointed him United States Ambassador to France in 1953.  Following that appointment he became Under Secretary of State for Economic Affairs in 1958 before becoming Under Secretary of State the following year.

In 1961, John F. Kennedy, appointed Republican Dillon Treasury Secretary. Dillon remained Treasury Secretary under President Lyndon B. Johnson until 1965.

Dillon proposed the fifth round of tariff negotiations under the General Agreement on Tariffs and Trade (GATT), conducted in Geneva 1960–1962; it came to be called the "Dillon Round" and led to substantial tariff reduction. Dillon was important in securing presidential power for reciprocal tariff reductions under the Trade Expansion Act of 1962. He also played a role in crafting the Revenue Act of 1962, which established a 7 percent investment credit to spur industrial growth. He supervised revision of depreciation rules to benefit corporate investment.

Philanthropy
A close friend of John D. Rockefeller III, he was chairman of the Rockefeller Foundation from 1972 to 1975.  He also served alongside John Rockefeller on the 1973 Commission on Private Philanthropy and Public Needs, and under Nelson Rockefeller in the Rockefeller Commission to investigate CIA activities. He had been president of Harvard Board of Overseers, chairman of the Brookings Institution, and vice chairman of the Council on Foreign Relations.

Metropolitan Museum of Art
With his first wife, Dillon collected Impressionist art. He was a longtime trustee of the Metropolitan Museum, serving as its President (1970–1977) and then chairman. He built up its Chinese galleries and served as a member of the Museum's Centennial committee. He personally donated $20 million to the museum and led a fundraising campaign, which raised an additional $100 million.

He received the Medal of Freedom in 1989.

Personal life
On March 10, 1931, Dillon married the former Phyllis Chess Ellsworth (1910–1982) in Boston, Massachusetts.  Phyllis was the daughter of John Chess Ellsworth and Alice Frances Chalifoux. The couple had two daughters:

 Phyllis Ellsworth Dillon Collins
 Joan Douglas Dillon (b. 1935), former president of French Bordeaux wine company Domaine Clarence Dillon.

In 1983, the widowed Dillon married the former Susan "Suzzie" Slater (1917-2019). She had first been married to Theodore "Ted" Sheldon Bassett (1911-1983) in 1939 (div.). In 1949 she married British entertainer Jack Buchanan (1891-1957). In 1961 she wed DeWitt Linn Sage (1905-1982), who again left her a widow.

Dillon died of natural causes on January 10, 2003, at the New York-Presbyterian Hospital in New York City at the age of 93.

Descendants
Through his daughter Joan's first marriage, he was a grandfather of Joan Dillon Moseley (b. 1954), and through her second marriage to Prince Charles of Luxembourg, he was a grandfather to Princess Charlotte (b. 1967) and Prince Robert (b. 1968) followed. After Prince Charles' death in 1977, Joan married Philippe-François-Armand-Marie, 8th duc de Mouchy in 1978, without further issue.

In fiction
In the Brendan DuBois novel Resurrection Day (1999), the Cuban Missile Crisis erupts into a full-scale nuclear war and Washington, D.C. is destroyed. President Kennedy is killed, as is Vice President Johnson, most of the Senate and Congress, and most members of the Kennedy administration. Dillon, the Secretary of the Treasury, is eventually found to have survived the war and becomes the 36th President of the United States.

See also

List of U.S. political appointments that crossed party lines
Rockefeller Foundation
Rockefeller family
Metropolitan Museum

References
Notes

Sources

Further reading
 Nelson Lichtenstein, ed., Political Profiles: The Johnson Years (1976)
 Eleanora W. Schoenebaum, ed., Political Profiles: The Eisenhower Years (1977)
 Bernard S. Katz and C. Daniel Vencill, Biographical Dictionary of the United States Secretaries of the Treasury, 1789–1995 (1996)
 Joseph M. Siracusa, ed., Presidential Profiles: The Kennedy Years (2004)
 Deane F. Heller, The Kennedy Cabinet: America's Men of Destiny (1961)
 Robert Sobel, The Life and Times of Dillon Read (1991), a study of the investment bank
 Robert C. Perez and Edward F. Willett, Clarence Dillon: A Wall Street Enigma (1995), a biography of Dillon's father.

External links
Ancestry of Joan Douglas Dillon

1909 births
2003 deaths
20th-century American politicians
United States Secretaries of the Treasury
United States Under Secretaries of State
Presidential Medal of Freedom recipients
Recipients of the Air Medal
United States Navy personnel of World War II
American people of Polish-Jewish descent
American people of Scottish descent
American people of Swedish descent
United States Navy officers
Rockefeller Foundation people
Groton School alumni
Harvard College alumni
Ambassadors of the United States to France
Recipients of the Legion of Merit
People from New Jersey
Lyndon B. Johnson administration cabinet members
Kennedy administration cabinet members
New York (state) Republicans
Presidents of the Metropolitan Museum of Art